The 2018 Supersport World Championship season was the twenty-second season of the Supersport World Championship, the twentieth held under this name.

Race calendar and results

Entry list

All entries used Pirelli tyres.

Championship standings

Riders' championship

Bold – Pole positionItalics – Fastest lap

Manufacturers' championship

References

External links

Supersport World Championship seasons
World